Theodore J. Sophocleus (May 28, 1939 – June 8, 2018) was an American politician from Maryland and a member of the Democratic Party. Before seeking political office, he was a pharmacist and a drug store chain executive.

Early life, education, and career
Ted Sophocleus was born in Baltimore on May 29, 1939, the son of Greek-American immigrants John and Despina Sophocleus. As a youth, he lived in the city's Highlandtown neighborhood and attended Patterson Park High School in Baltimore City.  After high school he graduated from the University of Maryland School of Pharmacy, where he earned his Bachelor of Science degree in Pharmacy in 1962.

After graduation, Sophocleus worked for the Read's Drug Store chain from 1960 to 1977, rising to an executive position. He subsequently was an executive with a Texas drug store chain before moving to Linthicum, Maryland, where he opened his own pharmacy.

Political career
Sophocleus first served two terms on the elected County Council of Anne Arundel County, Maryland, beginning in 1982. He took an active role on his constituents' behalf regarding noise abatement issues at Baltimore–Washington International Airport in Linthicum. He ran unsuccessfully for Anne Arundel County Executive in 1990 and 1994.

As a state legislator
Sophocleus began serving in the Maryland House of Delegates in 1993, when he was appointed by Governor William Donald Schaefer to replace Tyras S. Athey (who had resigned). Sophocleus was elected in his own right in 1998 and was serving in his fourth full term in the House of Delegates at the time of his death, representing Maryland's District 32 in Anne Arundel County.

He served on many committees, including the Appropriations Committee, and was also Deputy Majority Whip.

Legislative votes
While in the House, Delegate Sophocleus:
voted against the Clean Indoor Air Act of 2007 (HB359)
voted against Tax Reform Act of 2007 to increase sales tax by 20% (HB2)
 opposed medical marijuana
 voted for the Maryland Gang Prosecution Act of 2007 (HB713), subjecting gang members to up to 20 years in prison and/or a fine of up to $100,000
 voted in 2007 for a Maryland version of "Jessica's Law" (HB 930), eliminating parole for the most violent child sexual predators and creating a mandatory minimum sentence of 25 years in state prison
 voted in 2008 for Public Safety – Statewide DNA Database System – Crimes of Violence and Burglary – Post conviction (HB 370), helping to give police officers and prosecutors greater resources to solve crimes and eliminating a backlog of 24,000 unanalyzed DNA samples, leading to 192 arrests
 voted in 2009 for Vehicle Laws – Repeated Drunk and Drugged Driving Offenses – Suspension of License (HB 293), strengthening Maryland's drunk driving laws by imposing a mandatory one year license suspension for a person convicted of drunk driving more than once in five years
 also voted in 2009 for HB 102, creating the House Emergency Medical Services System Workgroup, leading to Maryland's budgeting of $52 million to fund three new Medevac helicopters to replace the State's aging fleet
 between 2015-2018, he annually voted to support classroom teachers, public schools, police and hospitals in Anne Arundel County. Since 2002, funding to schools across the State has increased 82%, resulting in Maryland being ranked top in the nation for K-12 education.

Election results
2006 Race for Maryland House of Delegates – District 32
Voters to choose three:
{| class="wikitable"
|-
!Name
!Votes
!Percent
!Outcome
|-
|-
|Pamela Beidle, Dem.
|17,964
|  18.6%
|   Won
|-
|-
|Mary Ann Love, Dem.
|17,697
|  18.3%
|   Won
|-
|-
|Theodore Sophocleus, Dem.
|17,661
|  18.3%
|   Won
|-
|-
|Mark S. Chang, Sr, Rep.
|16,569
|  17.1%
|   Lost
|-
|- 
|Terry R. Gilleland, Jr., Rep.
|13,632
|  14.1%
|   Lost
|-
|-
|Wayne Charles Smith, Rep.
|13,153
|  13.6%
|   Lost
|-
|Other Write-Ins
|75
|  0.1%
|   Lost
|}

2002 Race for Maryland House of Delegates – District 32
Voters to choose three:
{| class="wikitable"
|-
!Name
!Votes
!Percent
!Outcome
|-
|-
|James E. Rzepkowski, Rep.
|18,299
|  19.84%
|   Won
|-
|-
|Theodore Sophocleus, Dem.
|16,842
|  18.26%
|   Won
|-
|-
|Mary Ann Love, Dem.
|16,646
|  18.05%
|   Won
|-
|-
|Robert G. Pepersack, Sr, Rep.
|14,628
|  15.86%
|   Lost
|-
|- 
|Victor A. Sulin, Dem.
|13,694
|  14.85%
|   Lost
|-
|-
|David P. Starr, Rep.
|12,020
|  13.04%
|   Lost
|-
|Other Write-Ins
|82
|  0.09%
|   Lost
|}

1998 Race for Maryland House of Delegates – District 32
Voters to choose three:
{| class="wikitable"
|-
!Name
!Votes
!Percent
!Outcome
|-
|-
|Mary Ann Love, Dem.
|15,823
|  19%
|   Won
|-
|-
|Theodore Sophocleus, Dem.
|15,382
|  18%
|   Won
|-
|-
|James E. Rzepkowski, Rep.
|14,959
|  18%
|   Won
|-
|-
|Michael W. Burns, Rep.
|13,247
|  16%
|   Lost
|-
|- 
|Victor Sulin, Dem.
|12,658
|  15%
|   Lost
|-
|-
|Betty Ann O'Neill, Dem.
|11,752
|  14%
|   Lost
|-
|}

Death
Sophocleus died on June 8, 2018, while hospitalized in Baltimore. He was survived by his wife, Alice. Upon his death, both fellow Democrats and Republicans in the House of Delegates lauded his bipartisan helpfulness. Said one Republican Delegate: "Ted Sophocleus was one of the finest people I've met in public office. He was honest, true to himself and his constituents, and loved his family dearly."

Honors and awards
Sophocleus was inducted by his alma mater into the Patterson Park High School "Alumni Hall of Fame". He was honored by the Maryland State's Attorneys' Association as "Legislator of the Year" in 2004. The Maryland Network Against Domestic Violence also named him "Legislator of the Year", in 2005.

References and notes

1939 births
2018 deaths
Democratic Party members of the Maryland House of Delegates
People from Anne Arundel County, Maryland
Members of Anne Arundel County Council
American people of Greek descent
21st-century American politicians